Accuminulia is a small genus of tortrix moths belonging to the tortricine tribe Cochylini. The genus was first described by John W. Brown in 1999, and consists of two species, both of which are known from Chile.

Species
As of November 2019, the Online World Catalogue of the Tortricidae listed the following species:
Accuminulia buscki Brown, 2000
Accuminulia longiphallus Brown, 1999

References

Brown, John W. (1999). "A new genus of Tortricid moths (Tortricidae: Euliini) injurious to grapes and stone fruits in Chile". Journal of the Lepidopterists' Society. 53 (2): 60-64.
 , 2005: World Catalogue of Insects volume 5 Tortricidae.

Cochylini
Tortricidae genera
Endemic fauna of Chile